Ó Scannail is the both the name of a sept in Ireland and a surname. It is derived from the Gaelic term scannal, meaning contention or strife.

See also

 Mac Scannláin
 Ó Scannláin
 Ó Scealláin
 Scannell

References

 The Surnames of Ireland, Edward MacLysaght, p. 17, Dublin, 1978, .

Irish families
Irish-language surnames